Valerio Scassellati (born 24 July 1979 in Gualdo Tadino) is an Italian racing driver.

Career

Euro F3000
Scassellati competed in the Euro Formula 3000 championship in both 2001 and 2002, starting fourteen races and scoring one point overall.

Formula 3000
Scassellati graduated to the more prestigious International Formula 3000 series for 2003, where he contested selected events for the newly created BCN Competicion team throughout the season. It was a chaotic season for the team, with seven drivers sharing the two cars (Scassellati, Rob Nguyen, Alessandro Piccolo, Will Langhorne, Marc Hynes, Giovanni Berton and Ferdinando Monfardini). He scored no points, with a best finish of thirteenth at the season-opener.

Racing record

Complete International Formula 3000 results
(key) (Races in bold indicate pole position; races in italics indicate fastest lap.)

References

Career statistics from driverdb.com. Retrieved on December 20, 2007.

External links
 

1979 births
People from Gualdo Tadino
Living people
Italian racing drivers
Auto GP drivers
International Formula 3000 drivers
Sportspeople from the Province of Perugia